Heiskell is a surname. Notable people with the surname include:

Andrew Heiskell (1915–2003), American journalist and philanthropist
Frederick Heiskell (1786–1882), American newspaper publisher, politician, and civic leader
Hike Heiskell (1940-2016), American politician and lawyer
John N. Heiskell (1872–1972), American politician
Joseph Brown Heiskell (1823–1913), American politician
William Heiskell (1788–1871), American politician